XHHEM-FM is a radio station in Chihuahua, Chihuahua. Broadcasting on 103.7 FM, XHHEM is owned by Multimedios Radio and carries a pop format known as Hits FM.

History
XHHEM began in 1939 as XEM-AM, owned by Pedro Meneses Jr. The station originally broadcast at 1390 kHz. It was then sold to Mexican Broadcasting Co., S.A. and moved to 850; in 1972, the concession was transferred to Radio Chihuahua, S.A. Until the 1990s, it was a daytimer.

In the 1980s the station was Radio Éxitos; in the 1990s and early 2000s it was known as Radio Renacimiento with Christian music. In 2010, XEM was sold to Multimedios Radio to become an outlet for Milenio Radio.

In 2011, XEM received approval to migrate to FM. Its callsign was heavily modified, as there are already stations XHM-FM, XHEM-FM and XHEEM-FM. 850 AM shut off in 2012.

In August 2014, the Milenio Radio format was dropped for the Classic FM format, similar to XHPJ-FM in Monterrey.

On January 17, 2020, Multimedios Radio flipped XHCHA-FM to its La Lupe variety hits format, and Hits FM moved to XHHEM-FM, leading to the end of Classic.

References

Radio stations in Chihuahua
Mass media in Chihuahua City
Multimedios Radio